"I Like" is a song performed by American contemporary R&B group Kut Klose, issued as the first single from their debut studio album Surrender. Co-written by group member Tabitha Duncan, the song was their only hit on the Billboard Hot 100, peaking at #34 in 1995.

Charts

Weekly charts

Year-end charts

References

External links
 
 

1994 songs
1995 singles
Elektra Records singles
Kut Klose songs